Israel Tal (September 13, 1924, – September 8, 2010), also known as Talik (Hebrew: טליק), was an Israel Defense Forces (IDF) general known for his knowledge of tank warfare and for leading the development of Israel's Merkava tank.

Biography
Tal was born in Mahanayim, Mandatory Palestine. On his mother's side he was descended from Hasidic Jews who migrated to Safed and Tiberias in 1777. He lived in Safed from the age of five and lived through the 1929 Safed riots.  Later he lived in moshav Be'er Tuvia.

Tal began his military service at the age of 17, with the British Army's Jewish Brigade, serving as a machine gunner in North Africa and Italy during the Second World War. After the Jewish Brigade was disbanded in 1946, he enlisted in the Haganah. He served as a junior infantry officer during the 1947–1949 Palestine war, as a brigade commander during the 1956 Sinai War, an armored-division commander in Sinai Peninsula during the Six-Day War, and commander of the southern front during the final stages of the Yom Kippur War.

Israel Tal died in Rehovot on September 8, 2010.

Military career
Tal, who had been a hero of the Six-Day War, was an early opponent of the Bar Lev Line. He and General Ariel Sharon argued that it would not succeed in fending off Egyptian forces. After the official end of the Yom Kippur War, Tal, serving as commander of the southern front, received an order from Chief of Staff General David Elazar and Defense Minister Moshe Dayan to attack Egyptian forces. Tal refused to follow the order, insisting that it was an unethical order and requesting authorization for the requested attack from the Prime Minister and the Supreme Court. Such authorization never came. Tal won the argument, but his refusal to follow the order as a practical matter eliminated his chance of being nominated for the position of Chief of Staff to succeed General Elazar.

In 1970, the Israeli government decided it needed an independent tank-building capability due to uncertainty of overseas sales for political reasons. Tal led a development team that took into consideration Israel's battlefield characteristics and lessons learned from previous wars, and began the development and building of Israel's Merkava tank.

Armor doctrine

Tal was the creator of the Israeli armored doctrine that led to the Israeli successes in the Sinai surprise attack of the Six-Day War. In 1964, General Tal took over the Israeli armored corps and organized it into the leading element of the Israeli Defense Forces, characterized by high mobility and relentless assault. He re-trained all Israeli gunners to hit targets beyond . In open terrain, such long distance gunnery proved vital to the survival of the Israeli armored corps in subsequent wars. This gave the Israelis an opportunity to exploit this weakness in Arab military doctrine. Its mobility is considered comparable to the German Blitzkrieg and many hold it to be an evolution of that tactic. Tal's transformation and success in 1967 led the IDF to expand the role of armor. However, this resulted in reduced attention to other less glamorous, but essential aspects of the army, such as the infantry. Following the 1973 surprise attack, this excessive focus on fast striking offensive armor left the IDF temporarily without adequate defensive capability. Only in latter stages of the war (with the aid of a US$1.1 billion airlift, Operation Nickel Grass) did the armor break out and show its potential; General Avraham Adan's armor broke through the Egyptian lines, crossed the Suez Canal and enveloped the Egyptian 3rd Army near Suez. While the IDF has become a more balanced force since 1973, Tal's development of armored doctrine has been very important to the IDF and has influenced armored doctrines in other parts of the world.

Awards and honours

Israel Tal was awarded the Eliyahu Golomb Israel Security Award in 1961 and in 1973. In 1997, Tal was awarded the Israel Prize for his special contribution to the society and State of Israel.

In 1991, he received an honorary doctorate at Ben-Gurion University of the Negev. In 2002, he was chosen "Knight of Quality Government" by the Movement for Quality Government in Israel in the "Military and security" category. Israel Tal's picture appears in the Patton Museum of Cavalry and Armor's "Wall of Greatest Armor Commanders" along with compatriot Moshe Peled, Americans George S. Patton and Creighton Abrams and German Field Marshal Erwin Rommel.

See also
 List of Israel Prize recipients

References

External links
 Israeli Gen. Tal Honored by U.S. Armor Center
 Great armor commanders in History
 The International Commander’s Wall 
Israel Tal, Exhibition in the IDF&defense establishment archives 

1924 births
2010 deaths
Israel Prize for special contribution to society and the State recipients
Israel Defense Prize recipients
Israeli generals
Israeli Jews
Israeli people of the Yom Kippur War
Mandatory Palestine military personnel of World War II
Israeli people of the Six-Day War
Jewish Brigade personnel
Tank designers